Antonio Asprucci (20 May 1723 – 14 February 1808) was an Italian architect.

Biography
Asprucci was a pupil of Nicola Salvi, the creator of the Trevi fountain, whom he assisted with creating various works. Once independent, he worked for the Duke of Bracciano and built a house for Marcantonio Borghese IV in Pratica di Mare.

He was one of the first to introduce Neoclassicism in Rome as an architectural style.

In many works, such as those located in the Villa Borghese, he collaborated with his son Mario, also an architect. He was a member of the prestigious Academy of San Luca, where he was elected Principe (director) in 1790.

Works
Asprucci  worked on many projects for the Villa Borghese, in Rome, including the landscaping of the villa's gardens, from 1782 for over twenty years.

His most famous work is the small temple dedicated to Aesculapius inside the gardens of Villa Borghese. This small neoclassical building with a tetrastyle ionic portico is located in the middle of the Roman villa's pond.

Asprucci's son, Mario, was commissioned to design the classical villa Ickworth House in the Suffolk countryside in 1795.

Other works in the Roman villa include the church of Santa Maria Immacolata in Piazza di Siena and the reorganization of the Casino della Villa Pinciana, home to the Galleria Borghese, with the arrangement of the art objects contained therein.

References

Further reading

External links

1723 births
1808 deaths
18th-century Italian architects
Architects from Rome